Colbitz is a municipality in the Börde district in Saxony-Anhalt, Germany.

Colbitz is well known for its "Colbitzer" beer and the Colbitz-Letzlinger Heide. The Colbitz-Letzlinger Heide is found in the northern area of Colbitz, but most parts of the heath landscape are used by the Bundeswehr - the German Army.

External links
The Colbitzer Brewery (has information about area's history) (German)
Official website of Colbitz (German)

References 

Towns in Saxony-Anhalt
Börde (district)